Shekinah Elmore is an assistant professor in the department of radiation oncology at the University of North Carolina School of Medicine. As both a cancer doctor and a self-described "cancer person", she is known for her work in cancer patient advocacy among her fellow physicians and for her public speaking and writing. She has written and spoken publicly about surviving childhood rhabdomyosarcoma in the New England Journal of Medicine.

While training at Harvard Medical School she focused on understanding and improving radiotherapy access in resource-limited settings and promoting pathways for resident involvement in improving global radiotherapy. Elmore received a Fulbright award to travel to Rwanda and study how patients there experience cancer treatment, which she spoke about at TEDMED.

Education
She received her BA from Brown University, her MPH from Columbia University, and her MD from Harvard Medical School.

References

American oncologists
Women oncologists
African-American women physicians
African-American physicians
Harvard Medical School alumni
Living people
Year of birth missing (living people)
Place of birth missing (living people)
University of North Carolina faculty
Brown University alumni
Columbia University Mailman School of Public Health alumni
American women academics
21st-century African-American people
21st-century African-American women